Jubarella is a genus of moths in the family Geometridae erected by George Duryea Hulst in 1898.

References

Geometridae genera
Taxa named by George Duryea Hulst